"Umi e to" (Into the Beach) is the 11th single released by Japanese pop duo Puffy AmiYumi on April 5, 2000.

Track listing
Umi e to (words and music: Tamio Okuda)
Pool Nite (words and music: Tamio Okuda)
Umi e to [Original Karaoke]
Pool Nite [Original Karaoke]

Chart performance
The single peaked at number 15 on the singles chart, selling 20.660 copies that week, and stayed on the chart for 3 weeks.

References

Puffy AmiYumi songs
2000 singles
2000 songs
Songs written by Tamio Okuda